"Losing" is a song by Christian contemporary Christian music band Tenth Avenue North from their third studio album, The Struggle. It released on May 18, 2012, as the first single from the album. The song peaked at No. 1 on the Christian Songs chart.

Charts 
On the Christian AC Indicator chart the song was the most added song of the week for the week of June 9, 2012, and was played 326 times, an increase of 202 plays over the previous week for the song.

On the Hot Christian AC chart, the song was the most added song of the week for the week of June 9, 2012, and was played 397 times, an increase of 158 plays from the previous week.

On the Christian CHR chart the song was the most added song of the week for the week of June 9, 2012, and was played 257 times, an increase of 197 plays from the previous week.

Release 
"Losing" was released as the lead single from The Struggle on May 18, 2012.

Charts

Weekly charts

Year-end charts

References 
Notes

Footnotes

2012 singles
Tenth Avenue North songs
2012 songs